Matt Fletcher is an American college basketball coach, currently the head coach for the Concordia–St. Paul Golden Bears. He is a graduate and a member of the athletics hall of fame at North Branch Area High School. He played basketball at Southwest Minnesota State University where he graduated from with a Bachelor's degree in Sports Management.

Fletcher made many small coaching stops during his early career such as Concordia–Moorhead, South St. Paul High School, Kentucky Wesleyan (where he was also the women's golf coach), and Anoka High School. In 2013 he was hired as an assistant coach for the Upper Iowa Peacocks. He remained there for three seasons.

In 2016, he was hired to his first collegiate head coaching job at Bethany Lutheran College. During his four seasons there, the Vikings won one UMAC regular season championship (2018), two UMAC Tournament championships (2018 and 2020), and made it to the NCAA Division III men's basketball tournament twice (2018 and 2020). In 2018 he was named as the UMAC Coach of the Year. While there, he also served as the head coach of the women's golf team and earned the UMAC Coach of the Year award for golf in 2019.

In April 2020, Fletcher was named as the head of the Concordia–St. Paul Golden Bears of the Northern Sun Intercollegiate Conference.

He has a wife named Aly and two sons.

Head Coaching Record

References

College basketball coaches in the United States
Basketball coaches from Minnesota

Living people
Year of birth missing (living people)